Isobutyrylfentanyl is an opioid analgesic that is an analog of fentanyl and has been sold online as a designer drug. It is believed to be around the same potency as butyrfentanyl but has been less widely distributed on illicit markets, though it was one of the earliest of the "new wave" of fentanyl derivatives to appear, and was reported in Europe for the first time in December 2012.

Side effects 
Side effects of fentanyl analogs are similar to those of fentanyl itself, which include itching, nausea and potentially serious respiratory depression, which can be life-threatening. Fentanyl analogs have killed hundreds of people throughout Europe and the former Soviet republics since the most recent resurgence in use began in Estonia in the early 2000s, and novel derivatives continue to appear. A new wave of fentanyl analogues and associated deaths began in around 2014 in the US, and have continued to grow in prevalence; especially since 2016 these drugs have been responsible for hundreds of overdose deaths every week.

Legal status 
Isobutyrylfentanyl is a Schedule I controlled drug in the USA since 1 February 2018.

See also
 Acetylfentanyl
 Butyrfentanyl
 Cyclopropylfentanyl
 Furanylfentanyl
 List of fentanyl analogues

References 

Anilides
Designer drugs
Mu-opioid receptor agonists
Piperidines
Synthetic opioids